Kevin Yharim Varela Mendoza (born 8 January 1994) is a Mexican footballer.

Career

Youth, College & Amateur
Mendoza played with the U-17 and U-20 sides at Cruz Azul, before moving to the United States to play college soccer at Liberty University in Lynchburg, Virginia. Across four seasons with the Flames, Mendoza made 62 appearances, scoring 30 goals and tallying 15 assists. In 2016 and 2017 Mendoza was named Big South All-Conference first team, and in 2018 was the first Liberty Flame player to be named to the Atlantic All-Region team since 2012.

Whilst at college, Mendoza appeared for USL PDL clubs Tampa Bay Rowdies U23 and OKC Energy U23.

Professional
On 14 January 2019, Mendoza was selected 73rd overall in the 2019 MLS SuperDraft by Los Angeles FC. However, he did not sign with the club.

In July 2019, Mendoza joined Liga MX side Veracruz.

On 19 December 2019, Mendoza moved to USL Championship side Tampa Bay Rowdies ahead of their 2020 season. He made his professional debut on 25 July 2020, appearing as an 87th-minute substitute during a 1–1 draw with Birmingham Legion.

References

External links
 
 
 Tampa Bay Rowdies player profile

1994 births
Living people
Mexican expatriate footballers
Mexican footballers
Expatriate soccer players in the United States
Liberty Flames men's soccer players
C.D. Veracruz footballers
Tampa Bay Rowdies players
Association football midfielders
USL League Two players
USL Championship players
Los Angeles FC draft picks